Bandung Station or Hall Station (Stasiun Hall) is the largest train station in Bandung and, perhaps, in the West Java province. It also serves as the main station for KAI Operation Area 2 (Daop 2) administering the area of Bandung and Priangan.

Location
The station is on Kebon Kawung Street in central Bandung. The old station building was on Stasiun Timur street on the southern part of the railroad; later and currently the station has its new building on the northern part of the railroad.

On the Javanese railroad system, Bandung Train Station is on the Jakarta - Bandung - Yogyakarta - Surabaya railroad route — known as the Southern Java railroad route. The station is 709 meters above sea level.

Services
The following is a list of train services at the Bandung Station

Passenger services
Intercity trains
 Argo Parahyangan from and to 
 Argo Wilis from and to 
 Harina from and to  via 
 Lodaya from and to 
 Malabar from and to 
 Mutiara Selatan from and to 
 Turangga from and to 
 Ciremai Ekspres from and to 

Local trains

Freight services
 Over Night Services to and from  via –––

Facilities
Bandung station, like other major railway stations has supporting facilities and infrastructure for train operation. It has a passenger coach warehouse (west side of the station), locomotive warehouse (northwestern side of the station), turntable (western side of the station), reservation ticket building (northern station) and cargo area (southern part).

Headquarters of the Operational Area 2 are located to the south of this station. KAI central headquarters are located further east of this station.

Transportation
Train passengers who arrive on the station will find that Bandung station is easily accessible, and public transportation can be widely found in surrounding areas.

Taxis can be found at the northern part of the station. Taxis wait in the parking lot for passenger pickup.

Public (mass) transportation (Angkot) is more widely available with routes that carry passengers to destinations throughout the city. It can be found in both the northern part or the southern part of the station. Besides that, Ojek (motorcycle taxi) can be found outside the station complex.

References

External links

 PT KAI - the Indonesian rail company
 Forum Semboyan35 - Indonesian Rail fans Forum
 Stasiun Bandung  - Unofficial site of Bandung train station

Railway stations in West Java
Buildings and structures in Bandung
Dutch colonial architecture in Indonesia
Railway stations opened in 1884
Cultural Properties of Indonesia in West Java